The 2013 Malaysia Super Series Premier was the first super series tournament of the 2013 BWF Super Series. The tournament was held in Kuala Lumpur, Malaysia from January 15–20, 2013 and had a total purse of $400,000. A qualification was held to fill four places in all five disciplines of the main draws.

Men's singles

Seeds

  Lee Chong Wei (champion)
  Kenichi Tago
  Nguyen Tien Minh (first round)
  Sho Sasaki
  Hu Yun (quarterfinals)
  Jan Ø. Jørgensen
  Wang Zhengming (first round)
  Sony Dwi Kuncoro

Top half

Bottom half

Finals

Women's singles

Seeds

  Saina Nehwal
  Juliane Schenk (withdrew)
  Tine Baun (quarterfinals)
  Sung Ji-hyun (second round)
  Ratchanok Inthanon (withdrew)
  Tai Tzu-ying 
  Minatsu Mitani (quarterfinals)
  Eriko Hirose (first round)

Top half

Bottom half

Finals

Men's doubles

Seeds

  Koo Kien Keat / Tan Boon Heong
  Hiroyuki Endo / Kenichi Hayakawa
  Kim Ki-jung / Kim Sa-rang
  Hirokatsu Hashimoto / Noriyasu Hirata
  Hoon Thien How / Tan Wee Kiong
  Ko Sung-hyun / Lee Yong-dae
  Angga Pratama / Ryan Agung Saputro
  Vladmir Ivanov / Ivan Sozonov

Top half

Bottom half

Finals

Women's doubles

Seeds

  Christinna Pedersen / Kamilla Rytter Juhl
  Misaki Matsutomo / Ayaka Takahashi
  Duanganong Aroonkesorn / Kunchala Voravichitchaikul
  Shinta Mulia Sari / Yao Lei
  Bao Yixin / Tian Qing
  Ma Jin / Tang Jinhua
  Meiliana Jauhari / Greysia Polii
  Reika Kakiiwa / Miyuki Maeda

Top half

Bottom half

Finals

Mixed doubles

Seeds

  Chan Peng Soon / Goh Liu Ying
  Joachim Fischer Nielsen / Christinna Pedersen
  Muhammad Rijal / Debby Susanto
  Robert Mateusiak / Nadiezda Zieba
  Zhang Nan / Tang Jinhua
  Shin Baek-cheol / Eom Hye-won
  Danny Bawa Chrisnanta / Yu Yan Vanessa Neo
  Anders Kristiansen / Julie Houmann

Top half

Bottom half

Finals

References

2013 Malaysia Super Series
Malaysia Super Series
Malaysia Super Series
Sport in Kuala Lumpur